Oktay Kayalp was born in 1957 in Famagusta, Cyprus, he received his primary schooling at Canbulat Ilkokulu and secondary education at the city's prestigious Famagusta Namık Kemal High School. Upon completion of his secondary school, Kayalp graduated with a degree in Mechanical Engineering from Ege University.

Once back in Cyprus and completion of his national service he went into business as shipping agent directing the family business MK Nejati & Sons in Famagusta. He continued his business ventures until his election to be the Mayor of Famagusta at the 1994 local elections in North Cyprus. He was elected to this position an unprecedented four times, lastly in 2010. Kayalp is married with two children.

References 

Living people
1957 births
Turkish Cypriot politicians
People from Famagusta
Ege University alumni
Turkish Cypriot businesspeople